Andrejci is a settlement north of Martjanci in the Municipality of Moravske Toplice in the Prekmurje region of Slovenia.

There is a small Lutheran chapel with a three-storey belfry in the settlement. It was built in 1925.

References

External links 

Andrejci on Geopedia

Populated places in the Municipality of Moravske Toplice